Jebel Baggir is a mountain north-east of the Gulf of Aqaba in Jordan. In his 1878 book Sinai in Arabia and of Median, Charles Beke proposes that it may be the Biblical Mount Sinai. Beke also states that nearby Jebel Ertowa is Mount Horeb. Both are near Wady Yutm.

Mountains of Jordan
Landforms of Jordan